Norway was represented by Elisabeth Andreassen and Jan Werner Danielsen, with the song "Duett", at the 1994 Eurovision Song Contest, which took place on 30 April in Dublin. "Duett" was chosen as the Norwegian entry at the Melodi Grand Prix on 26 March, making it the third of four Eurovision appearances by Andreasson.

Before Eurovision

Melodi Grand Prix 1994 
The final was held at the Oslo Spektrum, hosted by Tande-P. Ten songs took part with the winner being chosen by a voting from six regional juries. Another set of jury votes were included, which came from the votes cast by the public via Norsk Tipping. Other participants included three-time Norwegian representative and MGP regular Jahn Teigen and Tor Endresen, who would represent Norway in 1997. The song "Uimotståelig" had been sent in and subsequently refused by the Norwegian Broadcasting Corporation for Melodi Grand Prix 1993.

At Eurovision 
On the night of the final Andreasson and Danielsen performed 17th in the running order, following Lithuania and preceding Bosnia and Herzegovina. The song was a traditional Eurovision-style ballad in a contest very heavily dominated by downtempo entries. At the close of voting "Duett" had received 76 points, placing Norway 6th of the 25 entries. The Norwegian jury awarded its 12 points to contest winners Ireland.

Voting

References

External links 
Full national final on nrk.no

1994
Countries in the Eurovision Song Contest 1994
1994
Eurovision
Eurovision